The Auchenorrhyncha suborder of the Hemiptera contains most of the familiar members of what was called the "Homoptera" – groups such as cicadas, leafhoppers, treehoppers, planthoppers, and spittlebugs. The aphids and scale insects are the other well-known "Homoptera", and they are in the suborder Sternorrhyncha.

Distributed worldwide, all members of this group are plant-feeders, and many are vectors of viral and fungal diseases of plants.

It is also common for Auchenorrhyncha species to produce either audible sounds or substrate vibrations as a form of communication. Such calls range from vibrations inaudible to humans, to the calls of many species of cicadas that can be heard for hundreds of metres, at least. In season, they produce the most characteristic and ubiquitous noise of the bush.

Etymology
The word "Auchenorrhyncha" is from the Greek αὐχήν, 'neck, throat' and ῥύγχος, 'snout'.

Classification

Debate and uncertainty as to whether the Auchenorrhyncha is a monophyletic group or not is ongoing; some authors, believing it was not, split it into two suborders, the Clypeorrhyncha (= Cicadomorpha) and the Archaeorrhyncha (= Fulgoromorpha). In the last 10 years, there has been evidence to support the monophyletic interpretation, and the most recent research indicates the Auchenorrhyncha are in fact a monophyletic lineage. A classification of the Auchenorrhyncha is:

 Infraorder Cicadomorpha (Clypeorrhyncha, Clypeata)
 Superfamily Cercopoidea (spittlebugs, froghoppers)
Aphrophoridae
Cercopidae
Clastopteridae
Epipygidae
Machaerotidae
 Superfamily Cicadoidea (cicadas)
Cicadidae (Platypediidae, Plautillidae, Tettigadidae, Tibicinidae)
Tettigarctidae (hairy cicadas)
Superfamily Membracoidea (Cicadelloidea)
Aetalionidae (Biturritiidae)
Cicadellidae (Eurymelidae, Hylicidae, Ledridae, Ulopidae, leafhoppers)
Melizoderidae
Membracidae (Nicomiidae, treehoppers)
Myerslopiidae (Cicadellidae, in part)
Infraorder Fulgoromorpha (Archaeorrhyncha, planthoppers)
Superfamily Fulgoroidea
Acanaloniidae
Achilidae
Achilixiidae
Caliscelidae
Cixiidae
Delphacidae
Derbidae
Dictyopharidae
Eurybrachyidae
Flatidae
Fulgoridae (lanternflies)
Gengidae
Hypochthonellidae
Issidae
Kinnaridae
Lophopidae
Meenoplidae
Nogodinidae
Ricaniidae
Tettigometridae
Tropiduchidae

Notes

External links

 Bibliography of the Auchenorrhyncha of Central Europe
 DrMetcalf: a resource on cicadas, leafhoppers, planthoppers, spittlebugs, and treehoppers
 Photographic Atlas of the Planthoppers and Leafhoppers of Germany
 Photographs of the Auchenorrhyncha of North and South America

 
Hemiptera
Insect suborders
Permian insects
Cisuralian animals
Cisuralian animals of North America
Cisuralian first appearances
Extant Permian first appearances
Hemiptera of North America
Paleozoic insects of Asia
Paleozoic insects of North America